Jean-Guy Gratton (born March 8, 1949) is a Canadian retired professional ice hockey forward.  He would play 188 games in the World Hockey Association with the Winnipeg Jets.

External links
 

1949 births
Canadian ice hockey forwards
Winnipeg Jets (WHA) players
Ice hockey people from Quebec
Living people